Sex, Life & Love is the second full-length studio disc from Rythm Syndicate, the dance-rock band founded by songwriter/producers Carl Sturken & Evan Rogers.  Released in 1992 (with the name changed to "RHYTHM Syndicate"), the disc features much of the same personnel, both in the band and in the recording, as their debut.  With the loss of former guitarist Mike McDonald, multi-instrumentalist Ron Skies was called in to handle guitars as well.

Released during the 1992 L.A. riots, the back cover features the plea "Pray for peace, justice, and an end to racism in L.A., America and the world."

The album features hypersexual lyrics and titles, with some being "Just for the Sex", "Can I Get Naked with You" and "I Wanna Make Love to You".

It failed to chart in America, and only one single aired; "I Wanna Make Love to You".  After the release, both Sturken & Rogers returned to  production and songwriting work for other artists.

Track listing
All songs written by Carl Sturken and Evan Rogers, except where noted.

Personnel
Rythm Syndicate
Evan Rogers - vocals and percussion
Carl Sturken - guitars, keyboards and percussion
Ron Skies - guitars, keyboards, violin, snare drum and vocals
John "Noodle" Nevin - bass, flute, sleigh bells and snare drum
Rob Mingrino - saxophone, flute and vocals
Kevin Cloud - drums and percussion

Additional personnel
Tony Lee: second guitar solo (track 11)

Production
Arranged & produced by Carl Sturken & Evan Rogers
Recorded & mixed by Daroll Gustamacho; additional recording by Steve Heinke, with assistance from Ed Murphy
Additional mixing by Martin Horenburg & Earl "Duke" Martin
Mastered by Steve Hall (Future Disc, Hollywood)

References

1992 albums
Rythm Syndicate albums
Albums produced by Carl Sturken and Evan Rogers
MCA Records albums